All of My Senses is an extended play (EP) by Grant Hart, formerly of the band Hüsker Dü. It was released in 1990.

The title track is taken from the album Intolerance (1989).

Track listing
All songs written by Grant Hart, except "Signed D. C." by Arthur Lee
 "All of My Senses" – 3:45
 "The Main" – 2:55
 "Signed D. C." – 2:37

 Track 1 is a shorter edit of the version on Intolerance.
 Track 2-3 are solo live acoustic performances, recorded 20 November 1989 at BBC Studios, London.

Personnel
 Grant Hart – vocals, instruments, production 
 Chopper Black – engineering on track 1
 Tom Herbers – engineering on track 1
 Lin Chung Fu – engineering on track 2-3
 John Golden – mastering

References

1990 EPs
Grant Hart albums
SST Records EPs